Imre Z. Ruzsa (born 23 July 1953) is a Hungarian mathematician specializing in number theory.

Life
Ruzsa participated in the International Mathematical Olympiad for Hungary, winning a silver medal in 1969, and two consecutive gold medals with perfect scores in 1970 and 1971. He graduated from the Eötvös Loránd University in 1976. Since then he has been at the Alfréd Rényi Institute of Mathematics of the Hungarian Academy of Sciences. He was awarded the Rollo Davidson Prize in 1988. He was elected corresponding member (1998) and member (2004) of the Hungarian Academy of Sciences. He was invited speaker at the European Congress of Mathematics at Stockholm, 2004, and in the Combinatorics section of the International Congress of Mathematicians in Madrid, 2006. In 2012 he became a fellow of the American Mathematical Society.

Work
With Endre Szemerédi he proved subquadratic upper and lower bounds for the Ruzsa–Szemerédi problem on the number of triples of points in which the union of any three triples contains at least seven points.  He proved that  an essential component has at least (log x)1+ε elements up to x, for some ε > 0. On the other hand, for every ε > 0 there is an essential component that has at most (log x)1+ε elements up to x, for every x. He gave a new proof to Freiman's theorem. Ruzsa also showed the existence of a Sidon sequence which has at least x0.41 elements up to x.

In a result complementing the Erdős–Fuchs theorem he showed that there exists a sequence a0, a1, ... of natural numbers such that for every n the number of solutions of the inequality ai + aj ≤ n is cn + O(n1/4log n) for some c > 0.

Selected publications

See also 
Ruzsa triangle inequality
Plünnecke–Ruzsa inequality

References

External links
 Some of Ruzsa's papers at the Rényi Institute

1953 births
Living people
Number theorists
20th-century Hungarian mathematicians
21st-century Hungarian mathematicians
Members of the Hungarian Academy of Sciences
Fellows of the American Mathematical Society
International Mathematical Olympiad participants